Raymond Anderson Morehart (December 2, 1899 – January 13, 1989) was an American major league baseball player.

Born in Terrell, Texas, Morehart attended Austin College and played two seasons for the Chicago White Sox before being traded (along with catcher Johnny Grabowski) for infielder Aaron Ward in January 1927; Morehart was therefore a member of the 1927 New York Yankees, a team often considered the greatest ever. As a rookie with Chicago, Morehart set a record with nine hits during a doubleheader.

Morehart died in Dallas, Texas on January 13, 1989. He was one of the last surviving players to have played with Babe Ruth and Lou Gehrig.

References

External links

Ray Morehart at Baseball Almanac

 Ray Morehart at SABR (Baseball BioProject)

1899 births
1989 deaths
Baseball players from Texas
Major League Baseball infielders
New York Yankees players
Chicago White Sox players
Austin Kangaroos baseball players
Flint Vehicles players
Wichita Izzies players
St. Paul Saints (AA) players
Columbus Senators players
Toronto Maple Leafs (International League) players
Dallas Steers players
Little Rock Travelers players
People from Terrell, Texas